Binyang County is a county of Guangxi Zhuang Autonomous Region, China, it is under the administration of the prefecture-level city of Nanning, the capital of Guangxi, with a permanent population of 782,255 and a hukou population of 1,051,373 as of the 2010 Census. It borders the prefecture-level cities of Laibin to the northeast and Guigang to the east. The main highways passing near the county seat are China National Highways 322 and 324. The local economy is based mostly on industry and services. The county seat is Binzhou Town, known as one of the oldest towns in Guangxi which has population over 200,000 people. People speak Binyanghua in Binyang, which is a branch of Cantonese.

Administrative divisions
There are 15 towns and 1 township in the county:

Towns:
Binzhou (宾州镇), Litang (黎塘镇), Xinqiao (新桥镇), Xinxu (新圩镇), Daqiao (大桥镇), Zouxu (邹圩镇), Gantang (甘棠镇), Gula (古辣镇), Luxu (露圩镇), Yangqiao (洋桥镇), Wangling (王灵镇), Wuling (武陵镇), Zhonghua (中华镇), Silong (思陇镇), Heji (和吉镇)

The only township is Chenping Township (陈平乡)

Climate

References

External links
Official website of Binyang County Government

 
Counties of Guangxi
Nanning